Nickelodeon is the first live album by The Masters Apprentices, released in November 1971 on Columbia Records.

Background
The Masters Apprentices began their 1971 national tour of Australia in Perth.  They enlisted producer Howard Gable to recorded their first show at the Nickelodeon Theatre using portable four-track equipment.  The band was tired and under-rehearsed, and were not satisfied with the results, these recordings became the live LP Nickelodeon, believed to be the second live rock album recorded in Australia. Two of its tracks—the brooding "Future of Our Nation" and the non-album cut "New Day"—were released as a single in June 1971.

Reception
The lead single "Future of Our Nation" would reach #51 on the Go-Set National Top 60 Charts.

Track listing
All songs written by Doug Ford and Jim Keays, except where noted.

Personnel 

The Masters Apprentices
 Doug Ford 
 Jim Keays 
 Colin Burgess 
 Glenn Wheatley 

Production Team
 Producer – Howard Gable

References 

General
  Note: limited preview for on-line version.
 
  Note: Archived [on-line] copy has limited functionality.
  Note: [on-line] version was established at White Room Electronic Publishing Pty Ltd in 2007 and was expanded from the 2002 edition. As from September 2010 the [on-line] version is no longer available.

Specific

1971 albums
The Masters Apprentices albums